Undercover Boss is a British reality television series. Each episode depicts a person who has a high management position at a major business, deciding to become undercover as an entry-level employee to discover the faults in the company. The following is a list of episodes of the British version of the show.

Summary
{| class="wikitable plainrowheaders" style="text-align:center;"
|-
! colspan="2" rowspan="2" |Series
! rowspan="2" |Episodes
! colspan="2" |Originally aired
|-
! First aired
! Last aired
|-
| bgcolor="#00BFFF" |
| 1
| 2
| 
| 
|-
| bgcolor="#FFDF00" |
| 2
| 7
| 
| 
|-
| bgcolor="#FF8C00" |
| 3
| 6
| 
| 
|-
| bgcolor="#2FCE1F" |
| 4
| 6
| 
| 
|-
| bgcolor="#F66767" |
| 5
| 6
| 
| 
|-
| bgcolor="#FF29FF" |
| 6
| 6
| 
| 
|}

Series 1: 2009

Series 2: 2010

Series 3: 2011

Series 4: 2012

Series 5: 2013

Series 6: 2014

Ratings

References

Episodes (United Kingdom)
Lists of British reality television series episodes
2009 British television seasons
2010 British television seasons
2011 British television seasons
2012 British television seasons
2013 British television seasons
2014 British television seasons